Epigmenio Exiga (born 28 March 1950) is a Mexican judoka. He competed in the men's half-heavyweight event at the 1972 Summer Olympics.

References

1950 births
Living people
Mexican male judoka
Olympic judoka of Mexico
Judoka at the 1972 Summer Olympics
Place of birth missing (living people)
20th-century Mexican people